Gatina is a settlement in the Municipality of Grosuplje in central Slovenia. The area is part of the historical region of Lower Carniola. The municipality is now included in the Central Slovenia Statistical Region.

Church

The local church is dedicated to John the Baptist and belongs to the Parish of Grosuplje. It is a medieval building that was extended in the 17th and 19th centuries.

References

External links

Gatina on Geopedia

Populated places in the Municipality of Grosuplje